Dolwyddelan – in Victorian times, often spelled Dolyddelen – is a village and community in Conwy county borough, Wales, on the main A470 road between Blaenau Ffestiniog and Betws-y-Coed. As a community, the population of Dolwyddelan was recorded in the 2001 Census as 427, and 55.8% of those residents could speak Welsh. The population increased to 474 in the 2011 census with the proportion of Welsh speakers falling to 50.8%.

Name 
The spelling of the village's name has varied over the years, though there appear to be two primary spellings with two primary meanings. The common modern spelling "Dolwyddelan" is translated as "Gwyddelan's meadow", referring to Saint Gwyddelan, an Irish missionary of the 6th century, after whom the parish church is named. There is some question as to which came first, the castle or the name.  Saint Gwyddelan is believed to have arrived around 600 AD.  A variant of this spelling is Dolwyddelen, which was particularly used by the railway between 1880 and 1980.

Before the First World War the alternate spelling "Dolyddelen" was in common use; it is translated as "Elen's meadow", named after Elen Luyddog. Elen's Castle Hotel, which is on the east of the village, is also named after Elen Llyddog.

Gwydir Estate 
For many years, Dolwyddelan was part of the Gwydir Estate. The estate was founded in the 16th century and was owned by the Wynn family. The estate was centered on Gwydir Castle and it dominated north Wales. In 1678 it passed to the Barons Willoughby de Eresby, based in Lincolnshire, and in 1892 it became the property of Gilbert Heathcote-Drummond-Willoughby, 1st Earl of Ancaster.

Much of the estate was under mortgage, and in 1894 Dolwyddelan was sold off.

Buildings of note

The village is particularly noted for Dolwyddelan Castle, the reputed birthplace of Prince Llywelyn ab Iorwerth (Llywelyn the Great), although doubt has been cast on this as the stone keep was not built until around 1220. It has better transport links than most villages, with the small Dolwyddelan railway station on the Conwy Valley Line still in operation.

There are two historic hotels in the village:
 Elen's Castle Hotel dates back over three hundred years and at one time belonged to Gilbert Heathcote-Drummond-Willoughby, 1st Earl of Ancaster.  In the 1870s he sold it to his game-keeper, who opened it as a coaching inn which specialised in hunting parties.
 Gwydir Arms Hotel (now called Y Gwydir) named for the estate that contained the village.

Geography
Nearby mountains include Moel Siabod to the north, Moel Penamnen and Y Ro Wen to the south and, further afield, Snowdon (Yr Wyddfa) lies approximately 10 miles to the west. Carreg Alltrem, a crag used by many rock climbers, can be found about a mile south of the village.

Industry 
During the Victorian period Dolwyddelan was surrounded by slate quarries. These quarries worked the Nod Glas Formation, which extended across Mid and North Wales. It was primarily a bed of soft, black shale, but in the area of the Dolwyddelan syncline it was partially metamorphisised into slate. The principle quarries were:

 Prince Llewellyn quarry and Chwarel Fedw
 Chwarel Ddu
 Ty'n-y-bryn quarry and Penllyn
 Rhiw-goch quarry and Ty'n-y-fallen

Governance
Dolwyddelan is included in the Betws-y-Coed electoral ward which is represented by a county councillor on Conwy County Borough Council.

Notable residents
 Angharad James, poet, lived in Cwm Penamnen, to the south of the village, most of her life and is buried in Saint Gwyddelan's church.
 John Jones, Talysarn, Welsh preacher was born in Dolwyddelan.
 Paul Griffiths, playwright, writer, and theatre critic lived and worked in the village.
 Rachel Johncock, sprinter lives in the village; she represented Great Britain in the 2012 World Junior Championships in Athletics for the 100m and 4 × 100 m relay.
 Baron Gwydyr, the Earl of Ancaster, lived in the house which is now Elen's Castle Hotel.
 Llywelyn the Great (ca.1173 – 1240) King of Gwynedd.
Eigra Lewis Roberts, writer, won two Prose Medals, National Eisteddfod Drama Crown and Medal. She was born in Blaenau Ffestiniog, and now lives in Dolwyddelan.
 Ellis Pierce, also known as Elis o'r Nant, was from Dolwyddelan.

Film
In 1980 Walt Disney used Dolwyddelan Castle and surrounding grounds to film all the external castle scenes in the film Dragonslayer. During the making of Dragonslayer (starring Peter MacNicol) many other scenes were shot in North Wales.

Images

References

External links

 Dolwyddelan Community Council Official Website
 A Vision of Britain Through Time
 British Listed Buildings
 Cistercian Way
 Genuki
 Geograph
 Office for National Statistics

 
Villages in Conwy County Borough